Nana Iwasaka (岩坂名奈 Iwasaka Nana, born July 3, 1990) is a retired Japanese volleyball player who plays for Hisamitsu Springs.

Life
She was born in 1990 in Fukuoka City. Iwasaka was part of the Japanese national team that won the 2011 Montreux Volley Masters in Switzerland and the bronze medal at the 2012 Olympic Games.

Nana retired in 2021.

Clubs
  Fukuoka Municipal Takamiya Junior High
  Higashikyushu Ryukoku High School
  Hisamitsu Springs (2009-)

National team
  Youth national team (2007)
  Junior national team (2008)
  Senior national team (2009, 2011-2021)

Awards

Individuals
 2011 Montreux Volley Masters "Best Server"
 2013-14 V.Premier League - Best6
 2017 Asian Championship "Best Middle Blocker"

Clubs 
 2011-2012 V.Premier League -  Runner-Up, with Hisamitsu Springs.
 2012 Empress's Cup -  Champion, with Hisamitsu Springs.
 2012-2013 V.Premier League -  Champion, with Hisamitsu Springs.
 2013 - Korea-Japan V.League Top Match -  Champion, with Hisamitsu Springs.
 2013 - Kurowashiki All Japan Volleyball Tournament -  Champion, with Hisamitsu Springs.
 2013 - Empress's Cup -  Champion, with Hisamitsu Springs.
 2013-2014 V.Premier League -  Champion, with Hisamitsu Springs.
 2014 Asian Club Championship -  Champion, with Hisamitsu Springs.

National team 
 2011 Montreux Volley Masters -  Champion
 2013 Asian Women's Volleyball Championship -  Silver medal
 2017 Asian Women's Volleyball Championship -  Champion

Junior Team
2008 14th Asian Junior Volleyball Championship -  Champion

References

External links
 Japan Volleyball League Biography
 FIVB Biography

Japanese women's volleyball players
Living people
1990 births
Sportspeople from Fukuoka (city)
Volleyball players at the 2018 Asian Games
Asian Games competitors for Japan
21st-century Japanese women